Helvécia is a large village in Bács-Kiskun county, in the Southern Great Plain region of southern Hungary.

History
Helvécia was founded in 1892 by Swiss-born teacher Heinrich Eduard Weber (Wéber Ede in Hungarian). 
After the great phylloxera epidemic that had destroyed much of the historical vineyard plantings in the 1870s, sandy soils of the Great Plains became much more valuable for grape cultivation than before. 
Helvécia was settled by 501 vineyard workers, most of them from the Balaton wine country. It gained independence of nearby Kecskemét in 1952.

Geography
Most of its inhabitants work in agriculture.
Approximately half of the population lives in hamlets. The rest is distributed between two centres approximately 3 km apart from each other: the older Helvécia-Ótelep, and the Szabó-Sándor-telep or Újtelep, originally a housing area for the former collective farm.

Twin towns – sister cities

Helvécia is twinned with:
 Cârța, Romania
 Sirnach, Switzerland
 Vršac, Serbia
 Zatín, Slovakia

Accident 

In 1973, a severe level crossing accident took place here with 37 people at least killed.

References 

Populated places in Bács-Kiskun County